Robert Anstruther may refer to:

Robert Anstruther (soldier), Scottish soldier in the service of Mary, Queen of Scots
Robert Anstruther (diplomat) (d. 1645), Courtier and ambassador
Sir Robert Anstruther, 1st Baronet (1658–1737), (additionally of Balcaskie, Fife and Braemore, Caithness in 1698) MP for Fife 1710
Robert Anstruther (British Army colonel), of the 58th (Rutlandshire) Regiment of Foot (renumbered in 1757 from 60th Regiment of Foot) 1755-68
Sir Robert Anstruther, 3rd Baronet (1733–1818), of the Anstruther baronets
Robert Anstruther (MP) (1757–1832), MP for Anstruther Burghs 1793 to 1794
Robert Anstruther (British Army officer) (1768–1809), Scottish general
Sir Robert Anstruther, 5th Baronet (1834–1886), MP for Fife 1864–1880 and St. Andrews 1885–1886, Lord Lieutenant of Fife 1864–1886
Robert Hamilton Anstruther (1862–1938), Royal Navy officer